Maswa is a town in Simiyu Region of Tanzania. It is the administrative seat of Maswa District. And the Original Inhabited people are Sukama (Nyantuzu).

The population of Maswa town - consisting of Binza and Nyalikungu wards - is 26,597.

Transport
Trunk road T36 from Shinyanga to Lamadi passes through the town.

References

Populated places in Simiyu Region